Angélico Sândalo Bernardino (born 19 January 1933 in Saltinho de Piracicaba, Brazil) is a Roman Catholic bishop of Blumenau.

Life
Angélico Sândalo Bernardino received on 12 July 1959 the sacrament of Holy Orders.

Pope Paul VI appointed him on 12 December 1974 Auxiliary Bishop in São Paulo and Titular Bishop of Tambeae. The Archbishop of São Paulo, Paulo Evaristo Cardinal Arns OFM, gave him the episcopal ordination on 25 January the following year; Co-consecrators were auxiliary bishops Benedito de Ulhôa Vieira and José Thurler from São Paulo.

Pope John Paul II appointed him on 19 April 2000, the first bishop of the diocese Blumenau, established on the same date. On 18 February 2009 Pope Benedict XVI accepted his age-related resignation.

In May 2022, he celebrated the marriage between former Brazilian President Luiz Inácio Lula da Silva and Rosângela da Silva.

References

20th-century Roman Catholic bishops in Brazil
1933 births
Living people
21st-century Roman Catholic bishops in Brazil
Roman Catholic bishops of São Paulo